Vani Buleki (born 23 October 2000) is a Fijian rugby sevens player.

Buleki was part of the Fijiana sevens team that won the silver medal at the 2022 Commonwealth Games in Birmingham. She later competed at the Rugby World Cup Sevens in Cape Town.

References 

2000 births
Living people
Female rugby sevens players
Fijian female rugby union players
Fiji international women's rugby sevens players
Commonwealth Games silver medallists for Fiji
Commonwealth Games medallists in rugby sevens
Rugby sevens players at the 2022 Commonwealth Games
Medallists at the 2022 Commonwealth Games